This is a list of cities, towns, and villages in Papua New Guinea.

List
Papua New Guinea's three cities are Lae, Mount Hagen, and Port Moresby. The other settlements in the following list are towns and villages.

See also 
 Districts of Papua New Guinea
 List of cities and towns in Papua New Guinea by population
 List of cities in Oceania by population
 Local-level governments of Papua New Guinea
 Provinces of Papua New Guinea
 Regions of Papua New Guinea

References

Citations

External links

 
Papua New Guinea, List of cities in
Cities